Émilien Devic (16 November 1888 – 21 August 1944) was a French footballer. He played in nine matches for the France national football team from 1911 to 1921. He was also named in France's squad for the football tournament at the 1912 Summer Olympics, but the French side withdrew from the competition. Devic was a French Resistance member during the Second World War and was shot by German forces in 1944.

References

External links
 

1888 births
1944 deaths
French footballers
France international footballers
Place of birth missing
Association football midfielders
French Resistance members
Resistance members killed by Nazi Germany
French people executed by Nazi Germany
People executed by Nazi Germany by firearm
Deaths by firearm in France
Footballers from Seine-Saint-Denis
French civilians killed in World War II
CA Paris-Charenton players
Red Star F.C. players
Racing Club de France Football players